Ajnala is a town, near Amritsar city and a nagar panchayat in Amritsar district in the state of Punjab, India. Kalian Wala Khuh, a martyrs place, is a tourist destination.

It has an average elevation of 213 metres (698 feet).
Ajnala is the hometown of the famous Punjabi singer AP DHILLON. During his visit to India 2021 for his India tour he visited his hometown Ajnala .

History

Indian Rebellion of 1857
During the Indian Rebellion of 1857, 282 sepoys of the 26th Native Infantry mutinied at Lahore and subsequently surrendered, believing they were going to be given a fair trial. They were summarily executed without trial by Frederick Henry Cooper, then–deputy commissioner of the district. The bodies were dumped into a deep dry well near the police station which was later filled with charcoal, lime, and dirt. .[3] In March 2014 the head of a local Sikh gurdwara announced that the remains of those buried had been uncovered in the excavation of a well within the shrine.[4] The well is known as Shaheedan da Khu in local Punjabi dialect, which means "the martyrs’ well".

Shaheedan da Khu

Old Tehsil, Ajnala
Old Tehsil, Ajnala is part of List of State Protected Monuments in Punjab, India and at S-PB-4.

Demographics
As of 2011 census, Ajnala has population of 21,107 of which 11,347 are males while 9,760 are females.
Literacy rate of Ajnala is 82.19 % higher than state average of 75.84 %. In Ajnala, Male literacy is around 86.05 % while female literacy rate is 77.72 %.
Ajnala Nagar Panchayat has total administration over 4,060 houses to which it supplies basic amenities. Population of Children with age of 0-6 is 2397 which is 11.36 % of total population of Ajnala (NP).

Politics 
The city is part of the Ajnala Assembly Constituency.

See also
 Gaggomahal
 Shaheedan da Khu

References

Cities and towns in Amritsar district
History of Punjab, India
Monuments and memorials in Punjab, India